Judit Schell (born 16 April 1973) is a Hungarian actress.

Career 
She graduated from the Academy of Drama and Film in Budapest in 1995. After graduating, she began her career as an actress at the Radnóti Miklós Theater, where she spent 8 years. She joined the National Theatre in 2003. She has been a member of the Thália Theatre since 2012.

She was a judge in A Dal 2018, the 2018 edition of the selection process in Hungary for the Eurovision Song Contest 2018, in Lisbon, Portugal.

Personal life 
She is married to Zoltán Schmied. They have a daughter, Borbála and a son, Boldizsár. Judit also has a son, László from a previous relationship.

Filmography

Theatre roles 
The number of performances total to 53.

Syncing roles 
 The Practice: Lindsay Dole – Kelli Williams
 Stargate: Samantha Carter – Amanda Tapping (2 seasons)
 Rescue Me: Laura Miles – Diane Farr
 Earth 2: Dr. Julia Heller – Jessica Steen
 Girls in Love: Anna – Sam Loggin
 Valkyrie: Nina Schenk Gräfin von Stauffenberg
 The Return of Casanova (2015) – Contributory

CDs and audio books 
  Magyarország kedvenc gyermekmeséi + dalok – Válogatott örökzöldek

Awards 
 Critics' Award (1998)
 Jászai Mari Award (2000)
 POSZT – Best supporting actress (2002)
 POSZT – Best actress under the age of 30 (2002)
 Critics' Award for Best Supporting Actress (2003)
 Hungarian Film Critics' Award (2006)
 Súgó Csiga Award (2006)
 Monte-Carlo, Best Actress Award for Just Sex and Nothing Else (2006)
 Order of Merit of the Republic of Hungary (2007)
 Hungary's Worthy Artist Award (2017)

References

Sources 
 Judit Schell's website

Other information 
 Schell at the Thália Theatre's website
 Magyar szinkron

1973 births
Living people
Hungarian television actresses
Hungarian voice actresses
People from Debrecen